L.V. Banks (October 28, 1932 – May 2, 2011) was an American Chicago blues and soul blues guitarist, singer and songwriter. He was a respected club performer in Chicago for many years. He recorded two albums for Wolf Records.

Life and career
Banks was born in Stringtown, Mississippi. He taught himself to play the guitar and fronted a blues band in Greenville, Mississippi. His musical influences included B.B. King, Howlin' Wolf, and Little Milton. Banks moved to St. Louis, Missouri, before he was drafted into the U.S. Army. After his duty was over, in the early 1960s, he relocated to Chicago, Illinois. He played on Maxwell Street and later was a regular fixture for over three decades in local clubs, particularly on the South Side. In the early 1990s, Banks acted as mentor to the then-teenaged blues musician Marty Sammon.

Banks's debut album, Let Me Be Your Teddy Bear, was released in June 1998 on the Austrian label Wolf. John Primer played guitar on the album. A second album, Ruby, was released by Wolf in 2000. It was his final album.

He died of heart failure in the South Shore Hospital, in Chicago, in May 2011, aged 78. His son, Tre' is following his father's tradition as a Chicago-based blues musician.

Discography

See also
List of Chicago blues musicians
List of soul-blues musicians

References

External links
Banks photographs in Maxwell Street, Chicago at Bobcorritore.com

1932 births
2011 deaths
American blues singers
American male singers
American blues guitarists
American male guitarists
Chicago blues musicians
Electric blues musicians
Soul-blues musicians
Blues musicians from Mississippi
Songwriters from Mississippi
People from Bolivar County, Mississippi
Songwriters from Illinois
Guitarists from Illinois
Guitarists from Mississippi
20th-century American guitarists
20th-century American male musicians
American male songwriters